The effective marginal tax rate (EMTR) is the combined effect on a person's earnings of income tax and the withdrawal of means testing of state welfare benefits. The EMTR is the percentage of an extra unit of income (extra dollar, euro, yen etc.) that the recipient loses due to income taxes, payroll taxes, and any decline in tax credits and welfare entitlements.

Calculating the EMTR is typically very dependent on individual circumstances and involves a consideration of welfare withdrawal rules, income tax laws, low income tax offsets, tax rebates and the individuals tax and welfare status. As such tables showing EMTRs are rarely published. The net effect however is generally a higher effective marginal rate of tax than that suggested by income tax tables.

See also
Welfare trap

References

External links

 http://melbourneinstitute.com/publications/reports/WebReport.pdf
 http://www.amp.com.au/group/3column/0,2449,CH34906%255FNI155234%255FSI3,00.html

Income taxes
Theory of taxation